is the sixth single by Japanese recording artist Arisa Mizuki. It was released on August 11, 1993 as the second single from Mizuki's first compilation album Fiore: Arisa Collection.

The title track was written by Jun Taguchi and composed by Yumi Matsutoya, under the pen-name Karuho Kureta. It served as theme song for the Fuji TV drama Jajauma Narashi, starring Mizuki herself. The B-side, "Utatte Agetai," was written by lyricist Kanata Asamizu, composed by pianist Toshiaki Matsumoto, and produced by Seiji Kameda. In 1995, Riona Hazuki recorded a cover of "Kimi ga Suki Dakara" for her album Riona.

Chart performance 
"Kimi ga Suki Dakara" debuted on the Oricon Weekly Singles chart at number 10 with 55,820 copies sold in its first week. The single charted for ten weeks and has sold a total of 176,360 copies.

Track listing

Charts and sales

References 

1993 singles
Alisa Mizuki songs
Japanese television drama theme songs
Songs written by Yumi Matsutoya
1993 songs